Jack Rodgers (1877 – 3 October 1941) was a New Zealand cricketer. He played in three first-class matches for Wellington from 1908 to 1915.

See also
 List of Wellington representative cricketers

References

External links
 

1877 births
1941 deaths
New Zealand cricketers
Wellington cricketers
People from Hokitika